Khufiyya (Arabic: خفيه, the silent ones) is a Sufist order of Chinese Islam. It was the first Sufist order to be established within China and, along with Jahriyya, Qadiriyya and Kubrawiyyah, is acknowledged as one of the four orders of Chinese Sufism.

Adherents of Khufiyya dwell mainly in Northwestern China, especially Gansu Province. The order follows the school of Hanafi in terms of jurisprudence. Traditional beliefs within the order claim the origin of Khufiyya to be Abu Bakr. In addition, the doctrines of Khufiyya are influenced by Confucianism, the Confucian approach or way of expounding Islamic sacred texts known as "Yiru Quanjing" (以儒詮經).

History 
The origin of Khufiyya can be traced to the Naqshbandis of Central Asia, a Sunni spiritual order of Sufism, which in turn has its roots in Sham. Their missions gave rise to the prosperity of Sufis in Bukhara and Samarkand. Makhdumi Azam, a 17th-century Naqshbandi leader, settled in Kashgar where his offspring promoted and cemented his teachings. Descendants of Azam were known as Miskiya and Ishaqis.

Khufiyya in China was pioneered by a Ming dynasty mufti from Lintao named Ma Shouzhen (馬守貞). He was born in 1633, during the reign of the Chongzhen Emperor. In his youth, he was mentored by the Miskiya missionary Afaq Khoja, who visited Hezhou in 1672 and greatly contributed to the dissemination of Sufism in China. At the age of 40, Shouzhen began his preaching. After 50 years, the order had grown into a sizable religious community.

Ma Laichi can be seen as another founding member of the Khufiyya order. Under the guidance of Ma Taibaba, a contemporary of Ma Shouzhen, Ma Laichi was introduced into Sufism. After pilgrimage to Mecca, he returned to China and preached for 32 years in Qinghai and Gansu Province. He later established the Huasi Menhuan, which remains an important menhuan or denomination, of Chinese Sufism.

In the early 18th century, Xian Meizhen, another pupil of Afaq Khoja, preached in the inner provinces of China. The Xianmen Menhuan denomination was founded by Meizhen. Gradually, over years of religious practice and conversion, different denominations of Khufiyya formed Jiaofang (教坊)–units of residence where followers of a menhuan reside. Just like those of Jahriyya, Khufiyyan Jiaofang were organized administrative divisions led by an Akhoond.

Throughout the reign of the Qianlong Emperor of the Qing dynasty, the "old" orders of Chinese Sufism represented by Khufiyya encountered a wave of reformists led by Ma Mingxin, the founder of Jahriyya which was known as the "New order". Ma Mingxing opposed and criticized Khufiyyan menhuan's hereditary lineage and attracted followers from Gansu, Ningxia, and Qinghai. In the later conflicts between Khufiyya and Jahriyya over both religious and political affairs, the Qing government supported Khufiyya and saw Jahriyya as a threat to its rule.

During the Cultural Revolution, Khufiyya was among the many religious organizations that suffered persecutions and pressures. Many mosques were demolished during this time, religious practice was forbidden. The state-imposed ban on religion was lifted after 3rd Plenary Session of the 11th Central Committee of the Communist Party of China. In contemporary China, followers of Khufiyya live mainly in Linxia, Tianshui and Lanzhou of Gansu province.

Philosophy 
Like other Sufi orders, Khufiyya is characterized by the veneration of saints, the search for enlightenment, and dhikr (quiet repetition of devotional phrases or prayers). The dhikr of Khufiyya followers are in a low tone or even silent, which references the meaning of the "Khufiyya", which means "the silent ones" in Arabic. In addition, Khufiyya was relatively conformist to the central government of China throughout different periods of history.

The Khufiyya order rejects excessive practice of the abstinence from worldly desires. It advocates for a way of spiritual life which balances between one's secular affairs and spiritual endeavors. 

Disciples of the Khufiyya order are required to complete the reading of the Quran and Hadiths. Notably, the sufi Tariqa of reciting silent dhikr is a necessity. A teacher of Khufiyya disciples is known as Murshid.

Demography 
, out of 6,781,500 Hui Chinese, 7.2% identify as Khufiyya followers. In Ningxia, there were 560 mosques affiliated with Khufiyya. Adherents of Khufiyya can be found in most of the northwestern provinces of China, with settlements in the inner provinces of Yunnan, Sichuan, Henan, Jilin and Hebei.

Menhuan 
There are more than 20 menhuan (denominations). The following list shows some of the major menhuans of the Khufiyya brotherhood:
Huasi Menhuan
Lintao Menhuan
Beizhuang Menhuan, Basuchi Menhuan, and Jinggou Menhuan
Mingyuetang
Humen Menhuan
Xianmen Menhuan
Hongmen Menhuan
Wenquantang and Tonggui Menhuan
Gaozhaojia Menhuan
Salar
Famen Menhuan
Dingmen Menhuan

References 

Islam in China
Naqshbandi order